Caristius fasciatus, the Greenland manefish, is a species of fish.

Description 
This large-eyed round fish is compressed in cross section. It is a pale blue-grey in colour with a few irregular darker bars and a dark, sail-like dorsal fin. The anal fins, like the dorsal fin, are dark, while the caudal and pectoral fins are small and translucent. Their dorsal, pectoral and anal fins have no spines and are made up of only soft rays (31-34, 16-18 and 18-21 rays respectively).

Similar species 
The Greenland manefish has fewer and larger teeth and fewer vertebrae than Caristius macropus and Caristius meridionalis. It differs from Caristius digitus through the lack of a series of  fingerlike papillae inside the opercle (the Greenland manefish has at most one), the short conical pharyngeal teeth (they are elongated in C. digitus), and fewer gill rakers.

Distribution and habitat 
This species is found in the Atlantic, Pacific and Indian oceans. It is known from the oceans around Argentina, Canada, Greenland, Namibia and South Africa. This species may, however, also rarely be found closer to the coast.

Ecology 
While the diet of these species has not been examined in any detail, it is known to eat pelagic crustaceans, such as plankton. From the capture of females and juveniles, it is believed that spawning occurs on the edges of sub-tropical waters, such as the Sargasso Sea, around the Gulf Stream and off the Azores.

References 

Fish described in 1930
Taxa named by Nikolai Andreyevich Borodin
Fish of Argentina
Fish of Canada
Fish of Greenland
Fish of Namibia
Fish of South Africa
Caristiidae